Christoph Buchner (born 23 July 1989) is a German former professional footballer who played as a defender.

External links

1989 births
Living people
People from Traunstein (district)
Sportspeople from Upper Bavaria
German footballers
Footballers from Bavaria
Association football defenders
3. Liga players
Regionalliga players
2. Liga (Austria) players
SV Wacker Burghausen players
1. FC Kaiserslautern II players
1. FC Saarbrücken players
FC Lustenau players
Chemnitzer FC players
SV Eintracht Trier 05 players
TuS Koblenz players
German expatriate footballers
German expatriate sportspeople in Austria
Expatriate footballers in Austria